Jawahar Deer Park also Shamirpet Deer Park is a deer park located in Shamirpet, Medchal–Malkajgiri district, Telangana, India. The Park is spread over 54 acres and has over 100 deers. It is close to Shamirpet Lake, plenty of deers can be seen going down to the water to quench their thirst.

The Park
The Park has over 100 deer, peacocks and different birds. The Deer park is maintained by the Government of Telangana. It is also home to one of the two Butterfly parks in Hyderabad, the other being Mrugavani National Park.

See also
 Mrugavani National Park
 Mahavir Harina Vanasthali National Park

References

Tourist attractions in Hyderabad, India
Ranga Reddy district
Parks in India